Rangárþing ytra is a municipality located in southern Iceland. Its major industries include tourism and agriculture. Rangárþing ytra was created 9 June 2002, when three municipalities, Rangárvallahreppur, Holta- og Landsveit and Djúpárhreppur were merged. The largest settlement is Hella.

References

External links
Official site 

Municipalities of Iceland